Diederich Krug (25 May 1821 – 7 April 1880) was a German pianist and composer. He was born in Hamburg and studied under Jakob Schmitt. He wrote a large number of pieces for piano, around 350 in all, which were popular with amateur pianists. Typical examples are gathered in the Pianoforte-Album which appeared as No. 1220 in the Collection Litolff; it contains eight works: Chant d'Adieu (Op. 307), Le petit Chevalier (Op. 312 No. 2), Einsames Haideblümchen (Op. 329, No. 2), La petite Coquette (Op. 306), Minnelied (Op. 289), Tyrolienne (Op. 308, No. 1), Der Wachtelruf (Op. 317 No. 2), and Impromptu-Romance (Op. 286).

He was the father of Arnold Krug.

External links

1821 births
1880 deaths
German classical pianists
Male classical pianists
19th-century German composers
19th-century classical pianists
19th-century male musicians